The 2000 Sacagawea dollar – Washington quarter mule is an error coin featuring the obverse of a Washington quarter (specifically a 50 State quarter) and the reverse of a Sacagawea dollar struck on a gold-colored dollar coin planchet.  It is one of the first known authentic mule coins to be released into circulation by the United States Mint.

History 
Mule coins were deliberately produced by US Mint employees for sale to coin collectors in the mid-1800s.  However, no authentic (accidental) mules of United States currency were known to exist.  This changed in the 1990s, when a Lincoln cent (dated 1993-D) with the reverse of a Roosevelt dime were discovered.  In 2000, Frank Wallis of Arkansas discovered a Sacagawea dollar with the obverse of a Washington quarter.

List of known coins 
As of September 2019, 19 examples have been confirmed, 16 of which are owned by a coin collector named Tommy Bolack.  Three different die pairs have been identified among the examples.

Notes

References 

Twenty-five-cent coins of the United States
Currencies introduced in 2000
United States dollar coins
Mint-made errors
Cultural depictions of Sacagawea